Mike Ballerino (April 10, 1901 – April 4, 1965) was an American World Jr. Lightweight boxing champion who began his career in the Philippines boxing with the U. S. Army.  Ballerino took the World Jr. Lightweight Championship against Steve "Kid" Sullivan on April 1, 1925, in Philadelphia, Pennsylvania, in a ten-round unanimous decision.

The Jr. Lightweight class is now  referred to as Super featherweight.

Early career in Manila, Philippines with the U.S. Army
Ballerino was born to an Italian family in Asbury Park, New Jersey, on April 10, 1901.  At the age of seventeen he began boxing for the Army in the Philippines, where he was stationed, and according to one source won the bantam championship of the Orient in a 20-round match. Many of his bouts were never documented.  At the age of 18, he would become known as a skilled bantamweight in Manila. He is not remembered as a polished boxer with refined, scientific technique, but a relentless and determined fighter who thrilled audiences.  He lacked a frequent record of knockouts and a strong punch, but he made up for it with enthusiasm and a relentless attack.

A few sources state he began boxing as early as 1918 with the Army, but Ballerino's first known bout in the Philippines was in January 1920 against Kid Ponzo, which he won in a third-round knockout. Rising to face top-rated opponents quickly, he met future Filipino World Flyweight Champion Pancho Villa nine times between January 1920, and October 1921 losing to him in six bouts.

Coming to the United States
Leaving the Army in the Philippines in late 1921, Ballerino decided it was time to begin "boxing in earnest".

He fought his first bout in the United States at the Eagles Athletic Club in Tacoma, Washington, on December 21, 1921, against Frankie Britt.  Britt was a well-known American featherweight and later lightweight who would contend for the Pacific Coast Title in both these weight classes. Though the bout was a six-round draw, the crowd was thrilled with the pace of the fight and Ballerino's value as a future contender for the Jr. Lightweight Title was established. His primary opponent in the Philippines, Pancho Villa arrived in America to fight the following year, with the assistance of legendary manager and promoter Tex Rickard.

Boxing management in Tacoma
Ballerino was managed in his early career in Tacoma, Washington, by Eddie Tait, a former American featherweight boxer, who had briefly managed boxers and opened movie theaters in the Philippines where Ballerino had his start.

Early boxing career in Tacoma, Washington
On May 18, 1922, he lost to Sammy Gordon in four rounds.  The Seattle Star advertised the bout as a "Special Event", but for a boxer who was nearly local to Seattle, there was relatively little pre-fight publicity. The Junior Lightweight Class was in its infancy and its boxers did not attract the attention of boxers from more established weight classes.  After taking the Jr. Lightweight Title, Ballerino would draw larger crowds, and greater coverage.

He fought Mike DePinto on June 12 and 26, 1922 in Washington drawing in six and losing in four rounds respectively. DePinto was a skilled Italian lightweight a shade below the skill of a serious contender.  Their June 12 bout was only a preliminary for a bout between Jimmy Sacco and Joe Gorman in Aberdeen.  Ballerino would not make the top of boxing cards often until taking the championship, though near the end of his career he would fight a number of name boxers in front of larger audiences.

On October 25, 1922, he fought Seattle bantamweight Buddy Ridley at the Auditorium in Tacoma, in a bout that was pre-determined as a six-round draw at the insistence of Ballerino's manager Eddie Tait.  The bout was a good draw, and spectators from Seattle flocked to Tacoma, as Balerino was "a rip snorting battler."  Leo Lassen of the Seattle Star noted that Ballerino "had always gone over big in every one of his scraps in the Northwest."  Ballerino's manager Eddie Tait had worked as a boxing matchmaker, and referee, and had once been a boxer in contention for the featherweight championship. Tait had managed a boxing club in Honolulu in 1908.<ref>Tait had been boxer and had managed boxing club in "Central Club the Latest", The Pacific Commercial Advertiser", Honolulu, Hawaii, pg. 3, 10 July 1908</ref>

Moving to Bayonne, New Jersey, from the West Coast
He settled in Bayonne, New Jersey, the state of his birth, and set out to find worthy opponents. Shortly after his move to New Jersey, he impressively fought twice at New York's Madison Square Garden. On January 5, 1923, he met Frankie Jerome in a twelve-round draw and on January 19, he met Carl Tremaine in a second round loss by technical knockout.

On June 18, 1923, he lost to Jewish lightweight Charley Goodman in a six-round points decision at the Polo Grounds in New York, a venue for well-attended, popular bouts. The fight was described as a "slugging match all the way."

On July 21, 1923, he gave an "artistic trimming" to boxer Joe O'Donnell in an eight-round win at Shetzline Ballpark in Philadelphia.  One source noted that in his typical style, "Ballerino slammed Joe with nearly everything in sight, but the Gloucester blacksmith took his punishment without a whimper".  The fight was a preliminary to an historic bout between his former opponent Pancho Villa and Kid Williams. Pancho Villa's feature fight received far more newspaper coverage.  After the move, he would find larger audiences, better known opponents, and more income boxing in New England and the Midwest where he primarily focused his career after January 1923."Villa Wallops Williams Good", The Evening Journal, Wilmington, Delaware, pg. 12, 1 August 1923

Boxing management in New York
He was managed by Frank Churchill from New York when he moved to Bayonne, New Jersey, and Mel Cooke, who was also a New York-based manager and promoter with boxing clubs in Brooklyn.  Like his previous manager, Eddie Tait, Churchill had managed boxers in Manila and the Far East around 1920.Churchill managed Philippine boxers in "Orient to Take Up Boxing in Earnest", Chicago Eagle, Chicago, Illinois, pg. 2, 25 December 1920

Ramp up to the World Jr. Lightweight Title
He first fought Steve "Kid" Sullivan, who would soon take the Jr. Lightweight Championship, on May 30, 1924, in Brooklyn, winning impressively in a twelve-round points decision.

He fought Vincent "Pepper" Martin, an important opponent, for the first time in a non-title fight on June 24, 1924, winning in a twelve-round points decision at the Nostrand Athletic Club in Brooklyn, New York. Martin was considered a top New York based contender for the Jr. Lightweight Championship.

Steve "Kid" Sullivan takes Jr. Lightweight Title
Steve "Kid" Sullivan took the Jr. Lightweight Title on June 20, 1924, against champion Johnny Dundee.

Still in line for a shot at the title, on July 15 and August 5, 1924, Ballerino fought Jr. Lightweight Championship contender Allentown Johnny Leonard in Brooklyn, New York, winning both non-title fights in 10 and 12 round points decisions.

Fighting in Brooklyn again, on September 10, 1924, he beat Tony Vacarelli, another Jr. Lightweight Championship contender, in a ten-round points decision.

Ballerino's first World Jr. Lightweight Title bouts with Steve "Kid" Sullivan
Ballerino fought Sullivan, now the new World Jr. Lightweight Champion, on October 15, 1924, in a Jr. Lightweight Title fight in New York, losing in a fifth-round knockout in their first meeting.

Taking and defending the World Jr. Lightweight Title
Ballerino fought a Jr. Lightweight Championship against Steve "Kid" Sullivan on December 15, 1924, at the Auditorium in Milwaukee, Wisconsin, in a ten-round newspaper decision.

In a World Jr. Lightweight rematch on April 1, 1925, Ballerino won a unanimous decision against his frequent rival Steve Sullivan at the Armory in Philadelphia, Pennsylvania, in a bout that went the full ten rounds. Several sources attribute Ballerino first taking the title from Sullivan at this bout, not his former bout with Sullivan in Milwaukee. One source wrote, "Ballerino took the lead at the opening of the fight and kept it up to the end, beating his foe in almost every round." Both judges agreed that Sullivan took only the first and seventh rounds.

He fought a ten-round World Jr. Lightweight Title fight resulting in a No Contest with the highly rated Jewish lightweight Frankie Callahan of Brooklyn in Columbus, Ohio, on June 1, 1925. Ballerino risked the title if he could not last the full ten rounds with Callahan.

On June 24, 1925, he retained his championship going ten full rounds to a draw with local boxer Babe Ruth in Philadelphia, Pennsylvania, at the Phillies Baseball Park before 10,000 satisfied fans. The fight was close, but in his typically aggressive style Ballerino won enough rounds to prevent his loss of the title.  as many as half the rounds may have gone to Ruth, but Ballerino landed many hard body shots throughout the bout, and managed to gain the victory.

He successfully defended the title on July 6, 1925, against Vincent "Pepper" Martin in a fifteen-round unanimous decision at Queensborough Stadium in Queens, New York.  Martin was recognized at the time as a top American Jr. Lightweight contender."Tex Rickard Names High Ranking Boxers", The Palm Beach Post, West Palm Beach, Florida, pg. 11, 12 January 1925

Losing the Jr. Lightweight Title one year later
Ballerino lost the Jr. Lightweight Title on December 2, 1925, in a ten-round technical knockout against Tod Morgan at Olympic Auditorium in Los, Angeles.  Though putting up a typically aggressive and tireless display, the Lincoln Star'' wrote that Ballerino only won the first round decisively. He was down for a nine count in the third round, outpunched badly against the ropes in the sixth, and had the crowd shouting to end the bout by the ninth and tenth rounds. The Associated Press wrote that Ballerino's seconds had his manager Frank Churchill threw in the towel, though they already knew Morgan had clinched the bout on points.  Ballerino held the title nearly a year, a significant period in the competitive world of East Coast American boxing.

Boxing after loss of the Jr. Lightweight Title

After losing his title, Ballerino fought Allentown Johnny Leonard twice more on June 5 and July 21, 1926, in Queens, New York, and his hometown of Bayonne, New Jersey.  He lost the June 5 bout on a ten-round points decision, but received a ten-round draw from his July 21 bout in Bayonne.

On September 30, 1926, he fought highly rated boxer Eddie Lord at Nutmeg Stadium in New Haven, Connecticut, winning in a ten-round points decision.

He fought Jewish boxer Joe Glick twice in November and December 1926 to ten-round draws in Brooklyn.

Boxing decline and retirement
On March 18, 1927, Ballerino began a five-match losing streak that ended with his last fight against Maxie Strub in Conneaut Lake, Pennsylvania, on June 27, 1928. He lost to reigning World Featherweight Champion Benny Bass, in a fast ten-round points decision on October 17, 1927.  "Bass, who was outweighed by seven pounds punched hard and accounted for a knockdown in the fourth round but Ballerino was up at the count of eight". Bass would take the World Junior Lightweight Championship from Tod Morgan in late 1929.

Getting out of boxing at the relatively early age of twenty-six was a wise choice for Ballerino, and not one every boxer was able to make.  He had only five losses by knockout in his career, so he may have fared better than many champions who left the ring having suffered greater physical injury.

By 1938, near the end of the Depression, he was taking down tents at the Tennessee State Fair as a "canvas" man.  He claimed to have spent all of the approximately $400,000 he made during his boxing career, though he was proud of making his own way and said he had no regrets.

He eventually retired to Tampa, Florida, where he died on April 4, 1965, at the relatively early age of 63.  With 98 bouts to his credit, his prolific boxing schedule with many top-rated opponents may have contributed to a somewhat early death.

Primary boxing achievements and honors

Ballerino was inducted into the New Jersey Boxing Hall of Fame on September 12, 1971.

See also
List of super featherweight boxing champions

References

External links 
 
 Mike Ballerino - Cyber Boxing Zone Profile

1901 births
1965 deaths
Featherweight boxers
Super-featherweight boxers
World boxing champions
Boxers from New Jersey
American people of Italian descent
People from Asbury Park, New Jersey
Sportspeople from Bayonne, New Jersey